Lund Church may refer to:

 Lund Church (Agder), a church in the municipality of Kristiansand in Agder county, Norway
 Lund Church (Rogaland), a church in the municipality of Lund in Rogaland county, Norway
 Lund Chapel, a chapel in the municipality of Nærøysund in Trøndelag county, Norway

See also 
 Lunde Church (disambiguation)